Abies fanjingshanensis is a species of conifer in the family Pinaceae.
It is found only in China, on Fanjing Mountain in Guizhou Province.
It is threatened by habitat loss.

References

fanjingshanensis
Endemic flora of China
Trees of China
Endangered flora of Asia
Plants described in 1984
Taxonomy articles created by Polbot